Synuchus is a genus of ground beetle native to the Palearctic (including Europe) and the Near East. It contains the following species:

 Synuchus adelosia Andrewes, 1934
 Synuchus agonoides (Bates, 1889
 Synuchus agonus Tschitscherine, 1895
 Synuchus amamioshimae Habu, 1978
 Synuchus andrewesi Habu, 1955
 Synuchus angusticeps Tanaka, 1962
 Synuchus angustus Habu, 1978
 Synuchus arcuaticollis Motschulsky, 1860
 Synuchus assamensis Deuve, 1986
 Synuchus atricolor Bates, 1883
 Synuchus bellus Habu, 1978
 Synuchus brevis Lindroth, 1956
 Synuchus breviusculus Mannerheim, 1849
 Synuchus calathinus Lindroth, 1956
 Synuchus callitheres Bates, 1873
 Synuchus cathaicus Bates, 1873
 Synuchus chabo Habu, 1955
 Synuchus chinensis Lindroth, 1956
 Synuchus congruus (A. Morawitz, 1862)
 Synuchus coreanus Kinschenhofer, 1990
 Synuchus crocatus Bates, 1883
 Synuchus cycloderus Bates, 1873
 Synuchus dubius (Leconte, 1854)
 Synuchus dulcigradus Bates, 1873
 Synuchus elburzensis Morvan, 1977
 Synuchus formosanus Lindroth, 1956
 Synuchus fukuharai Habu, 1955
 Synuchus fulvus Habu, 1978
 Synuchus gigas Keyimu & Deuve, 1998
 Synuchus gravidus Lindroth, 1956
 Synuchus hikosanus Habu, 1955
 Synuchus himalayicus Jedlicka, 1935
 Synuchus impunctatus (Say, 1823)
 Synuchus inadai Morita & Arai, 2003
 Synuchus intermedius Lindroth, 1956
 Synuchus ishigakiensis Morita & Toyoda, 2003
 Synuchus keinigus Morvan, 1994
 Synuchus laticollis Lindroth, 1956
 Synuchus limbalis Lindroth, 1956
 Synuchus longipes Lindroth, 1956
 Synuchus longissimus Habu, 1978
 Synuchus macer Habu, 1978
 Synuchus major Lindroth, 1956
 Synuchus melantho Bates, 1883
 Synuchus microtes Habu, 1978
 Synuchus minimus Lindroth, 1956
 Synuchus montanus Lindroth, 1956
 Synuchus nanpingensis Kirschenhofer, 1997
 Synuchus narae Lindroth, 1956
 Synuchus nitidus Motschulsky, 1861
 Synuchus nordmanni A. Morawitz, 1862
 Synuchus orbicollis A. Morawitz, 1862
 Synuchus pallidulus Habu, 1978
 Synuchus pallipes Andrewes, 1934
 Synuchus patroboides Lindroth, 1956
 Synuchus picicolor Lindroth, 1956
 Synuchus pinguiusculus Habu, 1978
 Synuchus pseudomorphus Semenov, 1889
 Synuchus pulcher Habu, 1978
 Synuchus rectangulus Lindroth, 1956
 Synuchus rjabuchinii Lafer, 1989
 Synuchus robustus Habu, 1978
 Synuchus rufofuscus Jedlicka, 1940
 Synuchus rufulus Habu, 1978
 Synuchus satoi Morita & Toyoda, 2003
 Synuchus semirufus (Casey, 1913)
 Synuchus shibatai Habu, 1978
 Synuchus sichuanensis Kirschenhofer, 1997
 Synuchus sikkimensis Andrewes, 1934
 Synuchus sinomeridionalis Keyimu & Deuve, 1998
 Synuchus sinuaticollis Habu, 1978
 Synuchus suensoni Lindroth, 1956
 Synuchus taiwanus Habu, 1978
 Synuchus takeuchii Habu, 1955
 Synuchus tanzawanus Habu, 1955
 Synuchus testaceus Jedlicka, 1940
 Synuchus tokararum Lindroth, 1956
 Synuchus truncatus Habu, 1978
 Synuchus ventricosus Lindroth, 1956
 Synuchus vivalis Illiger, 1798
 Synuchus yasumatsui Habu, 1955

References

External links
Synuchus at Fauna Europaea

 
Platyninae